Akyem-Awenare is a town in the Eastern Region of Ghana.

Notable sons
 Kwesi Amoako Atta - Ghanaian lawyer and politician.

References

Populated places in the Eastern Region (Ghana)